SPCS may refer to:

Society for the Promotion of Community Standards
State Plane Coordinate System
St. Paul's Convent School, a secondary school in Hong Kong
Soldier Plate Carrier System, a U.S. Army bulletproof vest
Satanicpornocultshop